Kenneth A. Marshall (born January 4, 1968) is an American politician and a Democratic member of the Rhode Island House of Representatives representing District 68 since January 1, 2013.

Education
Marshall earned his bachelor's degree from Bryant College (now Bryant University).

Elections
2012 When District 68 Democratic Representative Richard Morrison left the Legislature and left the seat open, Marshall ran in the September 11, 2012 Democratic Primary, winning with 744 votes (62.8%) and won the November 6, 2012 General election with 4,101 votes (63.2%) against Republican nominee Michael Donohue.

References

External links
Official page at the Rhode Island General Assembly

Kenneth Marshall at Ballotpedia
Kenneth A. Marshall at the National Institute on Money in State Politics

Place of birth missing (living people)
1968 births
21st-century American politicians
Living people
Bryant University alumni
Democratic Party members of the Rhode Island House of Representatives
People from Bristol, Rhode Island